Nationality words link to articles with information on the nation's poetry or literature (for instance, Irish or France).

Events
 Jean Lemaire de Belges joins the court of Archduchess Margaret of Austria

Works published
 Anonymous, Generides, publication year uncertain; written in the late 14th century; Great Britain
 Stephen Hawes, The Example of virtue, publication year uncertain; Great Britain
 Jean Lemaire de Belges, La couronne margaritique (this year or 1505), on the death of Philibert II, Duke of Savoy, the second husband of Archduchess Margaret of Austria, to whom the author was court poet; Belgian Waloon poet writing in French
 Hussain Vaeze Kashefi, Anvare Soheyli ("The Shining Star Canopus"), collection of verse fables, Persian
 Jacopo Sannazaro, Arcadia, prose and pastoral poetry, written 1480–1485, Italy
 Pierre Gringore, les Abus du monde, satire, France

Births
Death years link to the corresponding "[year] in poetry" article:
 October 29 – Shin Saimdang (died 1551), Korean painter, poet, embroiderer, calligrapher, scholar of Confucian literature and history
 November – Giovanni Battista Giraldi, who gave himself the nickname "Cinthio", also rendered "Cynthius", "Cintio" or, in Italian, "Cinzio" (died 1573), Italian novelist and poet
 Nicholas Udall, born this year, according to some sources, or in 1505, according to another (died 1556), English playwright, poet, cleric, pederast and schoolmaster

Deaths
Birth years link to the corresponding "[year] in poetry" article:
 Pandolfo Collenuccio (born 1444), Italian, Latin-language poet

See also

 Poetry
 16th century in poetry
 16th century in literature
 French Renaissance literature
 Grands Rhétoriqueurs
 Renaissance literature
 Spanish Renaissance literature

Notes

16th-century poetry
Poetry